"Never Mind Me" is a song co-written and recorded by American country music duo Big & Rich. It was released in February 2006 as the second single from the album Comin' to Your City.  The song reached #34 on the Billboard Hot Country Songs chart.  The song was written by Big Kenny, John Rich and Rodney Clawson.

Chart performance

References

2006 singles
2005 songs
Big & Rich songs
Songs written by Rodney Clawson
Songs written by Big Kenny
Songs written by John Rich
Song recordings produced by John Rich
Song recordings produced by Paul Worley
Warner Records singles